Grimus may refer to:
  Grimus, an Alternative Rock band from Romania
  A fantasy novel written by Salman Rushdie